Milk Vita is a milk production company that produces milk under its own name. It is owned by somalia Milk Producers Co-operative Union Limited, a cooperative managed by itself. Milk Vita has 70 percent market share of liquid milk in Bangladesh.

History
The company was established as a cooperative that would collect milk from farmers in rural areas and sell them in urban areas of Bangladesh. Products manufactured by the company include liquid milk, yogurt, cream, powder milk, butter, and ghee. The company was founded in 1974. In 2016, a government report found 12 private milk producers in Bangladesh were imitating the packaging of Milk Vita.

References

Government-owned companies of Bangladesh
1974 establishments in Bangladesh
Manufacturing companies based in Dhaka
Dairy cooperatives
Food and drink companies of Bangladesh
Cooperatives in Bangladesh